Boophis lichenoides is a species of frog in the family Mantellidae.

It is endemic to Madagascar.

Its natural habitats are subtropical or tropical moist lowland forests and swamps.
It is threatened by habitat loss.

References

lichenoides
Endemic frogs of Madagascar
Amphibians described in 1998
Taxonomy articles created by Polbot